The following elections occurred in the year 1905.

 1905 Liberian general election
 1905 Philippine local election

Asia
 1905 Philippine local election

Australia
 1905 South Australian state election

Europe
 1905 Dutch general election
 1905 Greek legislative election

 1905 Portuguese legislative election
 1905 Norwegian union dissolution referendum
 1905 Norwegian monarchy referendum
 1905 Spanish general election
 1905 Swedish general election

United Kingdom
 22 local elections  (list 
, among them 
 1905 Barkston Ash by-election
 1905 Bute by-election
 1905 Stalybridge by-election

North America

Canada
 1905 Alberta general election
 1905 Edmonton municipal election
 1905 Ontario general election
 1905 Saskatchewan general election
 1905 Yukon general election

United States
 United States Senate election in New York, 1905

Oceania

Australia
 1905 South Australian state election

New Zealand
 1905 New Zealand general election
 1905 City of Wellington by-election

See also
 :Category:1905 elections

here
1905
Elections